The Adam Buxton Podcast is a podcast in which the English comedian Adam Buxton interviews friends and celebrities. The first episode was released on 15 September 2015. Recurring guests include Buxton's comedy partner Joe Cornish of Adam and Joe, the filmmakers Louis Theroux and Garth Jennings and the comedian Tash Demetriou.

Format 
Most episodes begin with an introduction from Buxton as he walks through the Norfolk countryside with his dog Rosie, followed by a previously recorded conversation with the episode's guest. Interviews cover personal and cultural topics, punctuated with musical interludes from Buxton. Christmas episodes feature an appearance from Joe Cornish, with whom Buxton once formed the comedy duo Adam and Joe.

Buxton described the podcast as "a confection ... a heavily stylised greatest hits of a conversation". He told Wired that podcasts can "accommodate the rhythms and meanderings of a real conversation in a way that few other mediums are suited to do", unlike the tightly edited interviews and conversations on broadcast radio and television.

Reception 
The Guardian described Buxton's interviews as "a masterclass in softly-softly interviewing", and named episode 29, an interview with the documentary filmmaker Louis Theroux, one of the "ultimate podcast episodes". The Irish Times wrote that "Buxton's interviews are gentle, funny, compassionate, interested – it's almost as if you could learn how to be a better conversationalist just from listening to him". GQ wrote that Buxton "can be funny, flippant and throwaway, while also revealing a deeply personal emotional honesty and vulnerability".

Awards

Episodes

References

Comedy and humor podcasts
British podcasts